Sorin Botiş (born 14 April 1978) is a former Romanian football player.

Club career

Ferencváros
He made his debut on 2 August 2003 against Videoton FC Fehérvár in a match that ended 2–2.

Zalaegerszegi
He made his debut on 31 July 2006 against Videoton FC Fehérvár in a match that ended 3–2.

Budapest Honved
He made his debut on 25 July 2009 against Kaposvári Rákóczi FC in a match that ended 3–1.

Honours

Sheriff Tiraspol
Divizia Națională: 2001–02

Ferencvárosi
Nemzeti Bajnokság I: 2003–04
Magyar Kupa: 2003–04
Szuperkupa: 2004

Honvéd
Szuperkupa runner-up: 2009

UTA Arad
Liga III: 2014–15

References
Budapest Honved Official Website
Player profile at HLSZ

1978 births
Living people
Sportspeople from Arad, Romania
Romanian footballers
Association football defenders
FC UTA Arad players
FC Sheriff Tiraspol players
Ferencvárosi TC footballers
Zalaegerszegi TE players
Budapest Honvéd FC players
Békéscsaba 1912 Előre footballers
Nemzeti Bajnokság I players
Liga I players
Liga II players
Liga III players
Moldovan Super Liga players
Romanian expatriate footballers
Expatriate footballers in Moldova
Romanian expatriate sportspeople in Moldova
Expatriate footballers in Hungary
Romanian expatriate sportspeople in Hungary